Folke Klas-Ove Johansson (born 24 December 1943) is a Swedish heavyweight weightlifter who competed at the 1968 and 1972 Summer Olympics. He failed in the clean and press in 1968, and finished ninth in 1972.

References

1943 births
Living people
Swedish male weightlifters
Olympic weightlifters of Sweden
Weightlifters at the 1968 Summer Olympics
Weightlifters at the 1972 Summer Olympics
Sportspeople from Stockholm
20th-century Swedish people